Tatsuaki Gyo Shojima (庄島 辰尭 born August 18, 1993) is an American Football Center. He played college football for the UCLA Bruins as a walk-on student-athlete under head coach Jim Mora. As a redshirt junior, Shojima became the first Japanese-born student-athlete of full Japanese heritage, nationality and citizenship to play in NCAA Division I Football Bowl Subdivision (FBS) game.

Early years 
Shojima was born in Tokyo, Japan to Tatsuhiro and Hiroko Shojima and at age nine, moved to Redondo Beach, California with his family.

He grew up learning Shorinji Kempo, an esoteric Japanese martial art in which he holds a black belt in, and was not introduced to American football until he entered high school.

On September 30, 2010, he subdued an armed robber at a gas station. Shojima thanks his martial arts background and football experience for this accomplishment.

High school career 
Shojima attended Redondo Union High School, a public high school in Redondo Beach, California before transferring to Tokyo Nishi Metropolitan High School in Tokyo, Japan.

Upon graduating high school in 2012, he was selected onto the Japan national football team to compete in the IFAF U-19 World Cup hosted at Austin, Texas from June 30 to July 8.

College career

Santa Monica College 
After graduating from Tokyo Nishi Metropolitan high school, Shojima attended Santa Monica College. While playing for the Santa Monica Corsairs football team, Shojima earned a starting position under head coach Gifford Lindheim. In his second season, he took on a role as a team captain. After completing two consecutive seasons as American Pacific Conference Champions at Santa Monica College, Shojima transferred to UCLA as a preferred walk-on.

University of California, Los Angeles 
An Geography and Environmental Studies major, Shojima began taking classes at UCLA in September 2015. As a Bruin, Shojima redshirted his first year and contributed on the scout team; earning a scout player award in week 4 against University of Arizona.

He continued to contribute as a scout team player during his second year at UCLA and earned back-to-back scout player awards in week 2 against UNLV, and week 3 against BYU. During the winning game against UNLV, Shojima saw action as a reserve center, becoming the first Japanese-born student-athlete of full Japanese heritage, nationality and citizenship to play in NCAA Division I FBS game. Shojima continued to see action as a member of special teams versus BYU, Oregon State, USC and Cal. Shojima took on a role of sideline signal caller during his second season as well.

In his third and final year at UCLA, Shojima saw action as a reserve center during week 2 against University of Hawaii and started in all 13 games as a special teams performer. In the season opener against Texas A&M, UCLA Bruins overcame a 34-point deficit, the largest comeback in school history and the second-most ever in the Football Bowl Subdivision (FBS). After defeating California in their regular season finale, the Bruins became bowl-eligible and stayed undefeated at home for the first time since 2005. Although Bruins were defeated by the Kansas State Wildcats in the 2017 Cactus Bowl, Shojima once again had the honor of becoming the first Japanese player to play in the Division I FBS Bowl Game.

Shojima has been named to the Athletic Director's Academic Honor Roll in six consecutive academic quarters since Spring 2016 quarter.

References

External links 
 UCLA Bruins bio

1993 births
Living people
American football centers
American sportspeople of Japanese descent
Japanese players of American football
Players of American football from California
Sportspeople from Redondo Beach, California
UCLA Bruins football players